Bilno refers to the following places in Poland:

 Bilno, Radziejów County
 Bilno, Włocławek County